Batanga may refer to:

Ethnography 
 , of Cameroon and Equatorial Guinea, related to the Duala of Cameroon
 Batanga language, spoken by the Bataga

Places 
 Batanga, Burkina Faso, a village in Bam Province, Burkina Faso
 Batanga, Ghana, a community in Kumbungu District in the Northern Region of Ghana
 Grand Batanga, Cameroon

Other uses 
 Batanga (cocktail), a mix of tequila and cola
 A music genre created by Bebo Valdés
 Batanga Media, a digital media company focused on the Latino lifestyle and Latin music

See also
 Batangas (disambiguation)